Robert Alan Dressler (born February 2, 1954) is a former Major League Baseball pitcher who played for the San Francisco Giants, St. Louis Cardinals, and Seattle Mariners.

On July 24, he was traded to the St. Louis Cardinals for John Tamargo and purchased by the Seattle Mariners on June 7, .

External links

1954 births
Living people
Major League Baseball pitchers
San Francisco Giants players
St. Louis Cardinals players
Seattle Mariners players
Baseball players from Portland, Oregon
Leodis V. McDaniel High School alumni